Malcolm Malik Mackey (born July 11, 1970) is an American former professional basketball player who was selected by the Phoenix Suns in the first round (27th pick overall) of the 1993 NBA draft. Born in Chattanooga, Tennessee, Mackey played only one season in the NBA for the Suns, appearing in 22 games. He graduated from high school at Brainerd High School and played collegiately at Georgia Tech.  He currently works as a consultant and advisor for the East Point Jaguars.

External links
Malcolm Mackey college & NBA stats @ Basketball-Reference.com
French League profile
Italian League profile
Spanish League profile

1970 births
Living people
20th-century African-American sportspeople
21st-century African-American sportspeople
African-American basketball players
American expatriate basketball people in China
American expatriate basketball people in France
American expatriate basketball people in Greece
American expatriate basketball people in Italy
American expatriate basketball people in Poland
American expatriate basketball people in Spain
American expatriate basketball people in Turkey
American men's basketball players
Atléticos de San Germán players
Basketball players from Tennessee
CB Murcia players
Centers (basketball)
Georgia Tech Yellow Jackets men's basketball players
JDA Dijon Basket players
KK Włocławek players
Leones de Ponce basketball players
Liga ACB players
Omaha Racers players
Parade High School All-Americans (boys' basketball)
People from Chattanooga, Tennessee
Phoenix Suns draft picks
Phoenix Suns players
Power forwards (basketball)
Quad City Thunder players
Rockford Lightning players
Sporting basketball players